Atri Assembly constituency is an assembly constituency for Bihar Legislative Assembly in Gaya district of Bihar, India. It comes under Jahanabad (Lok Sabha constituency) Lok Sabha constituency along with other assembly constituencies viz. Arwal, Kurtha, Jehanabad, Makhdumpur, Ghoshi and Atri.

Members of Legislative Assembly

Election results

2020

References

External links
 

Assembly constituencies of Bihar